A-P-A Transport Corp. (also known as APA Transport) was a North Bergen, NJ based trucking and shipping company. At one point it was the nation's fourth largest interstate freight trucking company.

Origins
Founded in 1947 by Arthur Imperatore Sr. and his brothers Eugene, Arnold, George and Harold in West New York, NJ, it started as a local trucking business with a single surplus US Army truck, originally called "Imperatore Bros. Moving and Trucking." Later that same year they bought a second surplus truck, and then the name and two trucks of A&P Trucking Corp. for $800 from Albert Amorino, also of West New York. In the 1950s, after a few years of legal wrangling over the name by the A&P grocery chain, they simply added a trailing A.

Successful
In 1952 they built a new terminus at 88th Street and Tonnelle Ave in North Bergen and
by 1958 the company surpassed $1 million in gross revenue.
Eventually Arthur bought out all the other brothers in the business.
The company enjoyed great success, growing to more than 3,500 tractor-trailers and operating 31 freight terminals by 1991.

Shutdown
By 2001 it had fallen to 38th place, and finally closed its doors in February 2002.

Videos
40th Anniversary

Season's Greetings and Best Wishes for the New Year

References

External links
 David Faust Collection of APA truck pictures

Companies based in Hudson County, New Jersey
American companies disestablished in 2002
Transport companies established in 1947
Defunct companies based in New Jersey
Trucking companies of the United States
1947 establishments in New Jersey
Transport companies disestablished in 2002
2002 disestablishments in New Jersey
American companies established in 1947
Transportation companies based in New Jersey